The International Gold Cup is a prize awarded annually to the winner of a motor race held at the Oulton Park circuit, Cheshire, England. In the 1950s and 1960s it formed one of a number of highly regarded non-Championship Formula One races, which regularly attracted top drivers and teams. With the increasing cost of F1, the number of non-Championship events dwindled and the Gold Cup fell by the wayside in the mid-1970s. After this time the Cup was open to Formula 5000 cars, then Formula 3000 cars, before finally being reduced to a courtesy award made for the winner of the race deemed "highlight of the weekend". The Cup proper was reinstated by the Historic Sports Car Club in 2003, for the winner of a race for historic F1 cars at the same circuit.

The Oulton Park circuit opened in 1953 and the first Gold Cup meeting was held the following year. As a sign of things to come Stirling Moss won both the first and second events; he would go on to win the Gold Cup a further three times before an accident prematurely ended his career. Perhaps appropriately it was Moss that was at the wheel when the Ferguson P99 took the first ever victory by a four-wheel drive F1 car and the last victory for a front-engined F1 car, in the 1961 Gold Cup race. Other famous winners include Jack Brabham and Denny Hulme.

Winners

External links

 
Historic motorsport events